Wilfred Derrick Kent (1924–2010) was an English professional rugby league footballer who played in the 1940s. He played at club level for Wakefield Trinity (Heritage №).

Personal life and death
Kent was born in Wakefield, West Riding of Yorkshire, England in 1924.

He married Vera Turner in 1947 in Lower Agbrigg in Wakefield. Kent died in Wakefield in 2010, at the age of 85.

References

External links
Search for "Kent" at rugbyleagueproject.org

1924 births
2010 deaths
English rugby league players
Rugby league players from Wakefield
Wakefield Trinity players